Barmas (also Romanized as Barmes; also known as Barmesh, Bārmīz, and Byrmys) is a village in Azghan Rural District, in the Central District of Ahar County, East Azerbaijan Province, Iran. At the 2006 census, its population was 215, in 49 families.

Barmas 
 Barmas  '( is used as a surname in Iran

References 

wikipedia Persian

Populated places in Ahar County
Surnames